The 16th Filmfare Awards were held in 1969. 

Brahmachari led the ceremony with 9 nominations, followed by Neel Kamal with 8 nominations and Ankhen with 7 nominations.

Brahmachari won 6 awards, including Best Film and Best Actor (for Shammi Kapoor), thus becoming the most-awarded film at the ceremony.

Dilip Kumar received dual nominations for Best Actor for his performances in Aadmi and Sunghursh, but lost to Shammi Kapoor, who won the award for Brahmachari, his first and only win in the category.

Main awards

Best Film
 Brahmachari 
Ankhen
Neel Kamal

Best Director
 Ramanand Sagar – Ankhen 
Bhappi Soni – Brahmachari
Ram Maheshwari – Neel Kamal

Best Actor
 Shammi Kapoor – Brahmachari 
Dilip Kumar – Aadmi
Dilip Kumar – Sunghursh

Best Actress
 Waheeda Rehman – Neel Kamal 
Nargis – Raat Aur Din
Saira Banu – Diwana

Best Supporting Actor
 Sanjeev Kumar – Shikar 
Manoj Kumar – Aadmi
Raj Kumar – Neel Kamal

Best Supporting Actress
 Simi Garewal – Saathi 
Helen – Shikar
Shashikala – Neel Kamal

Best Comic Actor
 Johnny Walker – Shikar 
Mehmood – Neel Kamal
Mehmood – Sadhu Aur Shaitaan

Best Story
 Brahmachari – Sachin Bhowmick 
Ankhen – Ramanand Sagar
Neel Kamal – Gulshan Nanda

Best Screenplay
 Majhli Didi – Nabendu Ghosh

Best Dialogue
 Saraswatichandra – S. Ali Raza

Best Music Director 
 Brahmachari – Shankar-Jaikishan 
Ankhen – Ravi
Diwana – Shankar-Jaikishan

Best Lyricist
 Brahmachari – Shailendra for Main Gaoon Tum 
Ankhen – Sahir Ludhianvi for Milti Hai Zindagi Main
Brahmachari – Hasrat Jaipuri for Dil Ke Jharoke Main

Best Playback Singer, Male
 Brahmachari – Mohammad Rafi for Dil Ke Jharoke Main 
Brahmachari – Mohammad Rafi for Main Gaoon Tum
Neel Kamal – Mohammad Rafi for Baabul Ki Duaaein

Best Playback Singer, Female
 Shikar – Asha Bhosle for Parde Mein Rehne Do 
Ankhen – Lata Mangeshkar for Milti Hai Zindagi Main
Diwana – Sharda for Tumhari Bhi Jai Hai

Best Art Direction, B&W
Majhli Didi – Ajit Banerjee

Best Art Direction, Color
Noor Jehan – A.A. Majid

Best Cinematography, B&W
Saraswatichandra  – Nariman A. Irani

Best Cinematography, Color
 Ankhen – G. Singh

Best Editing
Saathi – N.M. Shankar

Best Sound
Shikar – P. Thakkersey

Critics' awards

Best Documentary
 Explorer

Biggest winners
Brahmachari – 6/9
Shikar – 4/5
Majhli Didi – 2/2
Saathi – 2/2
Saraswatichandra – 2/2
Ankhen – 2/7
Neel Kamal – 1/8

See also
 18th Filmfare Awards
 17th Filmfare Awards
 Filmfare Awards

References

 https://www.imdb.com/event/ev0000245/1969/

Filmfare Awards
Filmfare
1969 in Indian cinema